Air Comet (formerly Air Plus Comet) was an airline based in Madrid, Spain. It operated scheduled long-haul services from Madrid to 13 destinations in Central and South America, as well as services in Europe. Its main base was Terminal 1 at Madrid Barajas Airport. The airline cooperated with airlines such as AeroSur through codeshare agreements.

History

Air Plus Comet

The airline was established on 23 December 1996 as Air Plus Comet and started operations on 1 March 1997, based at Madrid Barajas Airport. On 11 December 1996 Oasis airline ceased operations and their only aircraft, an Airbus A310, and many of their pilots, ground and office personnel, etc. became the foundation of Air Plus Comet. In the post-takeover haste, the airline lacked a commercial name and its ICAO code was MPD, which stood for the last names of its three main executives (Mata, Pascual and Díaz).

It mainly operated long-haul charter services from Madrid and Palma de Mallorca to destinations in America and the Caribbean. It relaunched as a full-service carrier under the Air Comet name in January 2007. It was wholly owned by Grupo Marsans.

Air Comet
In January 2007, Air Comet took over some of now-defunct Air Madrid's Latin American routes. The airline was renamed 'Air Comet' and changed its livery.

On 11 February 2009, Air Comet was suspended from the IATA Clearing House due to non-payment of its January balance. On 21 December 2009, a High Court in London emitted a verdict favouring the German bank HSH Nordbank, which had sued Air Comet for not meeting the terms of payment for their leased aircraft. Therefore, the airline became legally unable to either operate their four A330-200s or sell any fare tickets. Air Comet's directors announced the airline was ceasing operations owing to bankruptcy.

Destinations
Air Comet flew to the following destinations:

Europe
Spain
Madrid - Madrid Barajas Airport base

The Caribbean
Cuba
Havana - José Martí International Airport

South America
Argentina
Buenos Aires - Ministro Pistarini International Airport
Bolivia
Santa Cruz de la Sierra - Viru Viru International Airport
Colombia
Bogotá - El Dorado International Airport
Medellín - José María Córdova International Airport
Ecuador
Guayaquil - José Joaquín de Olmedo International Airport
Quito - Mariscal Sucre International Airport
Peru
Lima - Jorge Chávez International Airport

Fleet 

When operations ended, the Air Comet fleet consisted of the following aircraft (as of 21 December 2009):

References

External links 

; (Archive)
Air Comet Fleet
Air Comet Fleet on planespotters.net 

Defunct airlines of Spain
Airlines established in 1996
Airlines disestablished in 2009
Companies based in Madrid